Danielle McCulley (born January 18, 1975) is a former professional basketball player for the Indiana Fever between 2000–02 and Seattle Storm between 2002-04 in the Women's National Basketball Association.

NCAA career
She played college basketball for Purdue Boilermakers between 1993–95 and Western Kentucky Hilltoppers between 1996-98.

USA Basketball

McCulley participated on the USA team as part of the 1999 Pan American Games in Winnipeg, Canada. The team went 4–3 and earned a bronze medal. McCulley averaged 7.5 points per game.

Professional career

ABL
She played for Portland Power in the American Basketball League in 1998-99 season.

WNBA

|-
| align="left" | 2000
| align="left" | Indiana
| 29 || 2 || 15.7 || .412 || .176 || .730 || 2.8 || 0.7 || 0.6 || 0.8 || 1.3 || 6.0
|-
| align="left" | 2001
| align="left" | Indiana
| 8 || 2 || 11.3 || .278 || .500 || .944 || 2.1 || 0.6 || 0.0 || 0.3 || 0.9 || 3.5
|-
| align="left" | 2002
| align="left" | Seattle
| 4 || 1 || 10.8 || .000 || .000 || 1.000 || 1.8 || 0.3 || 0.3 || 0.0 || 0.5 || 0.5
|-
| align="left" | 2003
| align="left" | Seattle
| 7 || 0 || 3.7 || .167 || .000 || – || 0.1 || 0.0 || 0.0 || 0.0 || 0.6 || 0.3
|-
| style="text-align:left" | Career
| style="text-align:left" | 4 years, 2 teams
| 48 || 5 || 12.8 || .365 || .174 || .783 || 2.2 || 0.5 || 0.4 || 0.5 || 1.0 || 4.3

European career
She also played for Apollon from Greece for 1999-00, Beşiktaş Istanbul from Turkey for 2000-01 season and also played for Fenerbahçe Istanbul from Turkey (won the Turkish Women's Basketball League) for 2001-02 and Ramat HaSharon from Israel for 2002-03.

References

External links
WNBA Player Profile
WNBA Statistics

1975 births
Living people
American expatriate basketball people in Turkey
Centers (basketball)
American women's basketball players
Western Kentucky Lady Toppers basketball players
Seattle Storm players
Indiana Fever players
Fenerbahçe women's basketball players
United States women's national basketball team players